The 1979 Monte Carlo Open was a men's tennis tournament played on outdoor clay courts at the Monte Carlo Country Club in Roquebrune-Cap-Martin, France that was part of the 1979 Colgate-Palmolive Grand Prix circuit. It was the 73rd edition of the tournament and was held from 9 April through 15 April 1979. First-seeded Björn Borg won the singles title, his second at the event after 1977.

Finals

Singles
 Björn Borg defeated  Vitas Gerulaitis 6–2, 6–1, 6–3
 It was Borg's 4th singles title of the year and the 43rd of his career.

Doubles
 Ilie Năstase /  Raúl Ramírez defeated  Victor Pecci /  Balázs Taróczy 6–3, 6–4

References

External links
 
 ATP tournament profile
 ITF tournament details

Monte Carlo Open
Monte-Carlo Masters
Monte Carlo Open
Monte Carlo Open
Monte